Klaus Gehrig (born 1948) is a German businessman, the CEO of Schwarz Gruppe, a private family-owned German retail group that owns Lidl and Kaufland, and is the largest retailer in Europe. Gehrig succeeded company owner Dieter Schwarz as CEO of Lidl in 2004.

References

1948 births
Living people
German chief executives
20th-century German businesspeople
21st-century German businesspeople
German businesspeople in retailing